The 1946–47 season was the 45th in the history of the Western Football League.

The league was again split into two divisions for the first time since the 1938–39 season, with seventeen new clubs having joined. The champions for the second time in their history were Trowbridge Town, and the winners of Division Two were Clandown. A system of automatic promotion and relegation was introduced for the first time, and due to the severe winter, several fixtures were not fulfilled and the season was abandoned on 5 June 1947.

Division One
Division One consisted of eighteen clubs: eleven from the previous season's single division were joined by seven new clubs. All had been members of the league before the war and had left in 1939, except for Bath City Reserves and Wells City, who had left in 1940.

Bath City Reserves
Frome Town
Glastonbury
Poole Town
Portland United
Street
Wells City

Division Two
Division Two consisted of thirteen clubs: three from the previous season's single division (Clandown, Douglas and Soundwell) were joined by ten new clubs:

B.A.C. Reserves
Chippenham Town Reserves
Cinderford Town
Hoffman Athletic
RAF Colerne
RAF Locking
RAF Melksham
Swindon Town Reserves, rejoining after leaving the league in 1937.
Thorney Pitts
Trowbridge Town Reserves, rejoining after leaving the league in 1894.

References

1946-47
4